Sango Bay is a settlement in the southern part of the Central Region of Uganda.

Location
Sango Bay is located in Sango Bay Parish, Kakuuto Sub-County, Kyotera District, in the Buganda Region of Uganda. The geographical coordinates of Sango Bay are:00°53'38.0"S, 31°43'22.0"E (Latitude:-0.893889; Longitude:31.722778).

Overview
Sango Bay is a fishing village, with Lake Nalubaale within walking distance to the east of Sango Bay. The area where the settlement is located is known as Sango Bay Conservation Area, bordered by the Tanzanian border to the south, Lake Nalubaale to the east, the Masaka–Mutukula Road to the west and Lake Nabugabo Conservation Area to the north.

The vegetation is characterised by wetlands, grasslands and forests. Over 300,000 Chlidonias leucopterus have been recorded in the area, as late as 1994. Ardeola ralloides, Pelecanus onocrotalus, Pelecanus rufescens and Hirundo atrocaerulea have been observed in the area.

This area was also the location of the Sango Bay Resettlement Camp. The camp was established in 2013, to accommodate over 5,000 people expelled from Tanzania for illegal entry by the then president, Jakaya Kikwete. They included Ugandans, Rwandese,  Congolese, Burundians, and stateless people. As of June 2016, the camp had been emptied and the refugees relocated to other camps in Uganda.

The Sango Bay area is also the location of Sango Bay Estates Limited, a sugar manufacturer established in 1930.

Jubilee Revival Church is in Sango Bay.

See also
 Sugar production in Uganda
 List of sugar manufacturers in Uganda

References

External links
Permanent Secretary Advises Government To Repossess Sango Bay As of 27 November 2008.

Populated places in Central Region, Uganda
Kyotera District